The British Pain Society (BPS) is a multidisciplinary community that brings together a diverse group of clinicians, nurses, physiotherapists, scientists, patients, and other professionals to improve the knowledge of pain, and implement new public policies and clinical practices to alleviate pain-related suffering. The society was founded in 1967. The BPS has a wide range of activities, from setting standards in clinical care, offering conferences, meetings, courses for special interest groups as well as publishing the British Journal of Pain.  Patients are also actively involved with the work of the society.

Services 
Booklets and other resources are available for people living with pain as well as an informative website available to the public to ensure that patients are aware of pain management services and about their pain.  A patient liaison committee was created in 2001 to act in an advisory capacity to the Council of the British Pain Society to ensure that the views of patients are represented within the Society. The committee works to improve patient information within the society and at least one member of the committee is invited to sit on each publication working party.

British Pain Society as a multidisciplinary team 
Dr. Andrew Diamond (former President) was instrumental in opening membership, allowing professionals who were not clinicians to be able to join and run the Society. Professor Paul Watson (a physiotherapist) notes that he was the first non-medical professional to be part of the Pain Society Council, and he later served as Chairs of the Education Committee and Scientific Committee, eventually becoming the President of the BPS in 2009. Today, there are hundreds of members from different specialties.

British Pain Society publications

British Journal of Pain 

British Journal of Pain is the official journal of the British Pain Society. It is a peer reviewed quarterly British journal with an international multidisciplinary editorial board. The journal publishes original research and reviews on all major aspects of pain and pain management.

Other publications 

As well as the British Journal of Pain, the society publishes Pain News, pain management guidelines, booklets for patients, pain scales in multiple languages that are downloadable and E-pain. Pain News is published quarterly to members updating events and latest updates in pain management. E-pain is an online platform that allows any health care professionals who wish to better understand and manage pain. It is free to all NHS staff members. There are eleven modules covering wide range of topics from acute to chronic pain, pathophysiology, and basic science bulletins, as well as specific modules such as cancer pain and pediatric pain. These e-learning modules are shared on e-learning anaesthesia (e-LA). The British Pain Society has also been involved in developing national guidelines such as National Institute for Health and Care Excellence (NICE).

History

Key milestones in BPS history 

 10 Nov 1967 – First meeting of what is now known as the British Pain Society (then called The Pain Group), organised by Dr Mark Swerlaw.  Annual meetings were held thereafter.
 1971 – The Pain Group constituted into the Intractable Pain Society (IPS) of Great Britain and Ireland.  A formal constitution was adopted.  At this time it was for doctors (Consultants) only.  This was the first professional society in the world devoted to Pain.
 1979 – The IPS of Great Britain and Ireland was registered as a charity.
 1987 – The IPS expanded membership to all health and research disciplines for the first time, paving the way for a merger with the existing British Chapter of the International Association for the Study of Pain (IASP) and becoming the Pain Society, the British Chapter of the IASP (see below)
 1988 – The Intractable Pain Society changed its name to the Pain Society for the first time (this was then reversed by the Council one year later, to be reincorporated a decade later)
 1989 – The Pain Society became a chapter of the IASP with the European Federation of Chapters of the IASP formed soon after
 1994-1997 – Professor Kate Seers was elected as a co-opted Council member, and as such was the first nursing member of the council. Alongside Dr. Beverly Collett, they were the first women on the council.
 1994 – Pain Medicine was formally recognised as the specialty within anaesthesia
 2004 – The Pain Society was renamed The British Pain Society (BPS)
 2007 – The Faculty of Pain Medicine of the Royal College of Anaesthetists was formed. This was aimed specifically at medically qualified pain specialists.

Detailed BPS history 
The first incarnation of the BPS was under the title of the Pain Group, which subsequently became the Intractable Pain Society of Great Britain and Ireland (IPSGBI) in 1967, with its members being anaesthetists, thus predating the foundation of the International Association for the Study of Pain (IASP), which was founded in 1973. Over time the membership of the society changed to become multidisciplinary and ultimately became known by its current BPS title in 2004. According to Dr William Campbell (former President, Vice President, Treasurer and Secretary), IASP stated that any pain society in the world must be multidisciplinary and follow the aims and objectives of IASP. Then the society was renamed as The Pain Society (of GB and Ireland).  Later, when the Irish members broke away to form their own organization, the Irish Pain Society in 2001, the society ultimately became the British Pain Society (BPS).

Pain relief clinics that focused primarily on nerve blocks were pioneered in the United States in the 1930s. The concept spread to Europe post World War II, with the first of these being set up in London, Plymouth, and Liverpool in 1947. Over the next two decades these evolved into more multidisciplinary clinics and by 1967 there were approximately 29 doctors (typically anaesthetists) working in this field in the United Kingdom. On 10 November 1967, the first ever meeting of the society took place at the Salford Postgraduate Medical Institute, University of Salford, UK. This meeting was organised by Dr M Swerdlow and was appointed as the first Chairman of the society, with Dr Mark Churcher and Dr J Challenger being appointed as Secretary and Treasurer respectively. There were 16 founding members, including Prof Sir Michael Bond, Dr Mark Mehta, Prof Birkenham, Dr R Maher and Dr Sam Lipton. Other early members included Prof Iggo, Dr J Hannington-Kiss, Dr John Lloyd, Dr Hugh Raftery, Dr Keith Budd and Dr T Hardy.

According to Dr William Campbell, the society was established to attempt to prevent the development of persistent pain without the use of opioids. Early members were mostly anaesthetists, but also included physicians such as Dr R Maher who pioneered the use of intrathecal phenol for cancer pain. It was felt at the time that the society could be considered as a meeting of minds for likeminded individuals.

Controversy 

In 2009, President Professor Paul Watson was asked to step down in relation to the controversy surrounding the disputed NICE guidelines for low back pain. A petition was gathered by Dr Chris Wells (current EFIC president) in order to generate an extraordinary general meeting regarding a perceived presidential conflict of interest between the society and NICE.  A vote of no confidence was carried out, and a narrow majority voted against Prof Paul Watson remaining as president. Professor Watson had spent over a decade working for the society setting up Annual Scientific Meetings. In his resignation letter, Professor Watson wrote: "If there is anything that I can help the society with please don't be afraid to contact me."
In recognition of his exceptional contribution and dedication to the BPS, Professor Paul Watson was awarded the Honorary Membership of the British Pain Society at Annual Scientific Meeting held in May 2017.

The unprecedented sequence of events left the society without a president and former president Professor Sir Michael Bond was appointed as interim president in order to maintain stability. Prof Sir Michael Bond had not been involved personally in the events.  At the time, Professor Sir Michael Bond is reported to have stated 'We deplore the blogs which vilified Paul and which were offensive to your Society and the profession of physiotherapy.'

The following year Prof Richford Langford was voted in as president by the membership. 2010 also saw changes in UK government and a controversial reorganization of health service by Andrew Lansley followed, which saw a greater emphasis on primary care via the setting up of new Clinical Commissioning Groups. Professor Langford, in conjunction with Drs Price, Johnson, and Baranowski, as well as over 70 colleagues, had a key role in developing Pain Management Pathways via Map of Medicine in response to the NICE guidelines, which were viewed by many Pain Specialists as significantly flawed.

During the years that followed, the BPS had a pivotal role in the National Pain Audit Report carried out by Dr Cathy Price and Dr Stephen Ward in conjunction with the Dr Foster organization. The report discussed the impact of pain and drew on data related to nearly 10,000 new attendees at pain clinics nationally and the accessibility to multidisciplinary care. In addition, the then BPS journal Pain Reviews was reborn as the British Journal of Pain (BJP) under Prof Felicia Cox. The new BJP publishing original pain-related research under the auspices of a professional publishing house. Following a governmental Pain Summit in Westminster organized by the BPS, the RCoA Faculty of Pain Medicine, the RCGP and the Chronic Pain Policy Coalition. Following the Pain Summit, pain related questions were included in the Health Survey for England (HSE) for the first time. The BPS worked in partnership with the Chronic Pain Policy Coalition, to devise questions for this snapshot survey of the nation's health.

The society is also actively promoting the wider education of health professionals in relation to pain management. In conjunction with the Faculty of Pain Medicine of the Royal College of Anaesthetists (FPMRCoA), the society is involved in encouraging the implementation of the EPM Lite teaching method to UK medical schools nationally. This was first taught in Bristol and adopted shortly after at other leading medical schools such as Imperial College London.

50th anniversary 
In 2017 the British Pain Society celebrates its 50th Anniversary (founded in 1967). The Annual Scientific Meeting was held from 3 to 5 May 2017. As amalgamation with the British Pain Society to initiate awareness, there will be a group of cycling enthusiasts cycling from London to the annual scientific meeting in Birmingham in a fund-raising campaign.

Pain News published in March 2017 summarises the history and evolution of the Society and contains interviews with past presidents including Dr Tim Nash, Professor Michael Bond, Dr Douglas Justin, Professor Paul Watson, Dr Joan Hester, Professor Richard Langford and Dr William Campbell.

Affiliations with other organisations 
The British Pain Society is affiliated with the International Association for the study of Pain as well as the Royal College of Anaesthetists and the Association of Anaesthetists of Great Britain and Ireland. The society is also a National Chapter of the European Pain Federation, commonly known as the European Federation of Individual Chapters (EFIC).

References

External links
https://www.britishpainsociety.org

1979 establishments in the United Kingdom